Baccalieu Island or Bacalhoo Island is a 5 km2 uninhabited island at the northern extremities of Conception Bay in Subdivision 1G, near the community of Red Head Cove, Newfoundland and Labrador, Canada.  It is separated from the island of Newfoundland by Baccalieu Tickle, a small strait and an abundant fishing ground. The island has some trees but is mostly rocky.

The name Baccalieu is derived either from the Portuguese bacalhau, Spanish bacalao or the Basque baccalos, all meaning "codfish". Early Portuguese maps dating before Columbus' voyage indicate an island west of the Azores named Terra do Bacalhau which may have been the whole island of Newfoundland. Modern Baccalieu Island was known to Europeans by that name since at least 1556, when it was drawn on the Gastaldi map as "Bacalaos".

Ecological Reserve

Baccalieu Island is the largest seabird island in Newfoundland and supports the greatest diversity of breeding seabirds in eastern North America. The island supports the largest known colony of Leach's storm-petrel in the world, approximately 40% of the global population and about 70% of the western Atlantic population of this species. It is a nesting area for 11 breeding species:

 Atlantic puffin (45,000 pairs - approximately 12% of the eastern North America population)
 Black-legged kittiwake (13,000 - approximately 5 to 7% of the western Atlantic breeding population); and
 Northern gannet (677 pairs - approximately 1.5% of the North American population).
 Northern fulmar
 Black guillemot
 Common murre
 Thick-billed murre
 Razorbill
 Herring gull
 Great black-backed gull
 The island also includes one of the largest winter populations of eider in Newfoundland.

The island has a surface of 5 km2, and the reserve spans 23 km2, including all of the island and one kilometre of ocean around the coast.

Lighthouses

Historically, two lighthouses were operated on Baccalieu Island; today both are automated. The lighthouse on the northern end is not operational any more; its light was extinguished in the early 1990s. This lighthouse was replaced as an aid to navigation by an automated light on a skeletal tower. It was originally a brick tower and was later encased in iron. The two storey residence attached was removed after 1950. The old tower's data:

 Tower height: 
 Height of focal plane: 
 Description: Red, conical cast iron
 Date established: 1859
 Date present tower built: 1858
 Date deactivated: 1990s
 Current use: Unknown
 Open to public: No

Four generations of the Ryan family "kept the light" at Baccalieu from 1858 to 1950. Other keepers at Baccalieu included Felix Noonan, Eric Blundon, John Hyde, Linus Walsh, Joseph Hatch, Pat Rice, and principal lightkeeper Raymond Hyde.

Ghost ship

In 1884 the merchant brig Resolven was found abandoned in the waters off Baccalieu and Catalina, Newfoundland and Labrador. The fate of the crew is unknown.

See also
 List of lighthouses in Newfoundland and Labrador
 List of lighthouses in Canada
 "The Cliffs of Baccalieu"

Notes

External links
 Buoys, Lights and Aids to Navigation Canadian Coast Guard
Baccalieu Trail
Historical Baccalieu Trail
Newfoundland Heritage Site
Lighthouse Digest
Baccalieu Island Ecological Reserve homepage
PDF map of the island and the reserve
Picture of Baccalieu Island Lighthouse

Uninhabited islands of Newfoundland and Labrador
Lighthouses in Newfoundland and Labrador
Nature reserves in Newfoundland and Labrador